Lonnie Paxton (born August 8, 1968) is an American politician who has served in the Oklahoma Senate from the 23rd district since 2016.

References

1968 births
Living people
Republican Party Oklahoma state senators
21st-century American politicians